Dowlatabad, is a village in the central part of the Khwahan District and is located generally in the Northeast Badakhshan Province.

References 

Populated places in Khwahan District